Silverwing or Silver Wing may refer to:

 Silverwing (series), a series of children's novels by Kenneth Oppel 
 Silverwing (novel), the 1997 first novel in the series
 Silverwing (TV series), a 2003 animated series based on the 1997 novel
 Silverwing (band), later known as Pet Hate, a 1980s British heavy metal band
 "Silverwing", a song by Arch Enemy from Burning Bridges
 Silver Wing Medal, a Philippine military decoration
 Silver Wing Service, a luxury air service offered by Imperial Airways
 Honda Silver Wing (disambiguation), a line of motorcycles and scooters

See also 
 Silver Wings (disambiguation)